The Danish Women's 2nd Division is a semi-professional association football league for women and the third division in Denmark. It is organized by the Danish Football Association (DBU) as part of the nation-wide Danmarksturneringen i kvindefodbold (Kvinde-DM) and is positioned between the second-tier Kvinde 1. division and the fourth-tier Kvindeserien in the Danish football league system. All of the 2nd Division clubs qualify for the proper rounds of the DBU KvindePokalen. Contested by 14 clubs, it operates on a system of promotion and relegation with the Kvinde 1. division and the Kvindeserien. At the conclusion of the regular fall season, the two group winners and four clubs from the second division qualify to the promotion play-offs in the spring season for four spots in the next season's second division, while four teams are relegated following the relegation play-offs. The highest level for reserve squads is the third tier.

History
The decision to establish a nation-wide third-tier league as part of the Danmarksturneringen i kvindefodbold below the second-tier Kvinde 1. division was made in mid-November 2020 at the Board of Directors meeting of the Danish Football Association (DBU). It was following a recommendation from DBU's women's elite committee and preparatory work done over the last couple of years by a group under the Kvindedivisionsforeningen. The reasoning behind was that further the development of women's football in Denmark by continuously raise the level of the domestic tournaments, namely the second division, in order to benefit the women's national football team. It was decided that the inaugural format for the league would consist of a west and east division geographically divided with each seven teams, and be played in two stages, one qualifying stage in the fall season with the promotion and relegation play-offs held in the spring season. With the addition of the third nation-wide division in 2021–22 season, the highest level for reserve squads were downgraded from the second to the third tier, where an unlimited number of reserve squads would partake.

Winners of the 2nd Division

Footnotes

References

External links
 Official league site 

Third level women's association football leagues in Europe
Women
3
Third level football leagues in Europe
Professional sports leagues in Denmark
Sports leagues established in 2021